21509 Lucascavin, provisional designation , is a small asteroid from the inner regions of the asteroid belt, approximately  in diameter. It is the namesake of the tiny Lucascavin family located within the Flora clan. It was discovered on 22 May 1998, by astronomers with the Lincoln Near-Earth Asteroid Research at the Lincoln Laboratory's Experimental Test Site near Socorro, New Mexico. The presumed S-type asteroid has a rotation period of 5.8 hours. It was named for the 2005-ISEF awardee Lucas James Cavin.

Orbit and classification 

The cluster in turn belongs to the encompassing Baptistina family within the larger Florian region. Since other astronomers have ruled out the existence of a Flora family in the first place, Lucascavin has also been grouped to the alternative Duponta family, a core group inside the Florian region.

Lucascavin orbits the Sun in the inner asteroid belt at a distance of 2.0–2.5 AU once every 3 years and 5 months (1,259 days; semi-major axis of 2.28 AU). Its orbit has an eccentricity of 0.11 and an inclination of 6° with respect to the ecliptic.

Naming 

This minor planet was named after Lucas James Cavin (born 1986) who won the second place in the 2005 Intel International Science and Engineering Fair for his engineering project. The official  was published by the Minor Planet Center on 22 August 2005. At the time he attended the Chillico High School in Missouri, United States.

Physical characteristics 

Lucascavin is an assumed S-type asteroid, in agreement with the overall spectral type of the Lucascavin, Baptistina and Flora family groupings.

Rotation period 

Between 2006 and 2016, several rotational lightcurves of Lucascavin have been obtained from photometric observations by Czech astronomer Petr Pravec. Best-rated lightcurve analysis from 2013 gave a rotation period of  hours with a consolidated brightness amplitude between 0.23 and 0.30 magnitude. Pravec also determined a low V–R color index of 0.474.

Diameter and albedo 

The Collaborative Asteroid Lightcurve Link assumes an albedo of 0.24 – derived from 8 Flora the namesake of the Flora clan – and calculates a diameter of 2.54 kilometers based on an absolute magnitude of 15.14.

References

External links 
 2005 Awardees, Lincoln Laboratory 
 Asteroid Lightcurve Database (LCDB), query form (info )
 Dictionary of Minor Planet Names, Google books
 Discovery Circumstances: Numbered Minor Planets (20001)-(25000) – Minor Planet Center
 Asteroid Family Dynamics in the Inner Main Belt (Flora and Nysa/Polana), Melissa Joy Dykhuis, University of Arizona
 
 

021509
021509
021509
Named minor planets
19980522